Il Paride is an opera in five acts composed by Giovanni Andrea Bontempi who also wrote the libretto. The first Italian-language opera to be given in Dresden, it was first performed on 3 November 1662 at the Dresden Castle to celebrate the marriage of Erdmuthe Sophie von Sachsen, the daughter of John George II, Elector of Saxony, and Christian Ernst, Margrave of Brandenburg-Bayreuth. The opera was revived on 21 June 2011 at the Potsdam Sanssouci Festival and on 24 August 2012 at the Tyrolean State Theatre as part of the Innsbruck Festival of Early Music.

Recordings
Il Paride – RAI Orchestra and Chorus, Carlo Franci (conductor). Recorded 24 November 1963, Rome. Label: Voce (LP)

References

Further reading
Torresi, Riccardo (2007). "Una proposta scenografica per Il Paride di Giovanni Andrea Angelini Bontempi" in Esercizi Musica e Spettacolo 20, nuova serie 11, 2006-2007, pp. 7–32. Morlacchi Editore.

External links
Bontempi, Giovanni (1662). Il Paride (original libretto). Melchior Bergen 
Video from the 2012 Innsbruck performance (official YouTube channel of the Innsbruck Festival of Early Music) 

Operas by Giovanni Andrea Bontempi
Italian-language operas
1662 operas
Operas